Hermógenes López (19 April 1830, in Naguanagua, Carabobo – 17 December 1898, in Valencia, Carabobo) was a Venezuelan soldier, farmer and acting president of his country between 1887 and 1888, after the resignation of General Antonio Guzmán Blanco who went into voluntary exile in Paris.

There is scarce information about his childhood, which appears to have been limited to elementary education and farm work. From the arrival of José Tadeo Monagas and José Gregorio Monagas to the presidency (1848–1858), he entered into military activity, being part of the revolutions and battles of those decades; after that he returned to his life as farmer. López became military leader of Nirgua in 1858, and participated in the 1862 campaign of Carabobo, that overthrew its head of government, General Marcos López.

López, was the head of Carabobo state after an electoral fight against General Gregorio Cedeño (May 1881). He also served as president (governor) of Yaracuy state. 
Because of the retirement of Guzmán Blanco, he assumed the presidency of Venezuela on 8 August 1887 presiding a transition period, which concluded on 2 July 1888, when Juan Pablo Rojas Paul assumed the presidency.

Hermógenes López's provisional government enjoyed the active cooperation of the Liberal Party and the society.
During his term in office, he inaugurated the railroad between Puerto Cabello and Valencia and an underwater cable with Europe (February 1888).
In April 1888, the remains of General José Antonio Páez were returned to Venezuela. This act was carried out against the will of Guzmán Blanco, who considered Paéz as an oligarch.

Hermógenes López died in 1898.

Hermógenes López cabinet (1887-1888)

See also 
Venezuela
Presidents of Venezuela

References 

“Dictionary of History of Venezuela", Polar Foundation, 1997.
  Official biography
  Hermógenes López

Presidents of Venezuela
Venezuelan soldiers
People from Valencia, Venezuela
1830 births
1898 deaths
People from Carabobo
Venezuelan people of Spanish descent
Venezuelan farmers